Maso may refer to:

 Maso (goddess)
 Maso (spider), a genus of spiders in the family Linyphiidae
 La Masó,  municipality in Spain
 Bartolomé Masó, Cuba, a municipality
 An informal term to describe Macedonia

People with the given name
 Maso di Banco (died 1348), Italian painter
 Maso da San Friano (1536–1571), Italian painter 
 Maso Finiguerra  (1426–1464), Italian goldsmith, draftsman, and engraver

People with the surname
 Bartolomé Masó (1830–1907), Cuban patriot
 Carole Maso, American author
 Jo Maso (born 1944), French former rugby footballer 
 Pedro Masó (born 1927), Spanish director, producer, and scriptwriter
 Rafael Masó (1880–1935), Catalan architect
 Yamazaki Maso (born 1966), Japanese noisician & performer